Wilaquta (Aymara wila blood, blood-red, quta lake, "red lake", Hispanicized spelling Huilacota) is a mountain in the Peruvian Andes, about  high. It is situated in the Moquegua Region, Mariscal Nieto Province, Carumas District, and in the Puno Region, Puno Province, Acora District. Wilaquta lies north of the lake Aqhuyach'alla (Pasto Grande) and southeast of the mountain Qurini.

References

Mountains of Moquegua Region
Mountains of Puno Region
Mountains of Peru